Grey's Anatomy is an American television medical drama that debuted on the American Broadcasting Company (ABC), as a mid-season replacement for Boston Legal on March 27, 2005. While creating the show, producers put an emphasis on the casting process. The series has aired for nineteen seasons, and focuses on the fictional lives of surgical interns and residents, as they gradually evolve into seasoned doctors, while trying to maintain personal lives. The show's premise originated with Shonda Rhimes, who serves as an executive producer, along with Betsy Beers, Mark Gordon, Krista Vernoff, Rob Corn, Mark Wilding, and Allan Heinberg. It is primarily filmed in Los Angeles, California.

The series was created to be racially diverse, utilizing a color-blind casting technique. All roles for the series are cast without the characters' races being pre-specified, in keeping with Rhimes' vision of diversity. The series' protagonist, Meredith Grey, is portrayed by Ellen Pompeo. Pompeo starred as the leading role in Moonlight Mile, which explains the significance of her being cast as Meredith. Meredith is assigned to work under Miranda Bailey the only character developed with a racial description in mind, who is portrayed by Chandra Wilson. On Wilson's addition to the cast Rhimes reported, "[Wilson] is exactly who Miranda is." The other interns working with Meredith under Bailey are along with Cristina Yang, George O'Malley, Izzie Stevens, and Alex Karev  played by Sandra Oh, T.R. Knight, Katherine Heigl and Justin Chambers respectively. Chambers' character was not originally part of the pilot but was added later as the fifth and final intern. Oh was initially brought to play the character of Bailey, but pressed to read for the role of Cristina instead at the audition. Many actors read for the role of Dr. Derek Shepherd including Isaiah Washington, but when Patrick Dempsey read for the part, "he was just perfect", according to Rhimes. Washington  was cast as Burke, because the original actor to play Burke had to withdraw.

The second season marked the introduction of Eric Dane as leading plastic surgeon Dr. Mark Sloan and Sara Ramirez as ortho-resident Dr. Callie Torres. They were initially cast as recurring characters, but both were given star billing at the opening of the third season. Ramirez was cast after ABC executives offered her a role in the network show of her choice, Dane had previously auditioned unsuccessfully for a role in the pilot episode. Kate Walsh also joined the show in season two, after making a guest appearance in season one as Dr. Addison Montgomery, the estranged wife of Derek, and leaves the show at the end of the third, in order to launch her own spin-off medical drama Private Practice.  Burke departs at the conclusion of the third season, and is replaced by Erica Hahn, played by Brooke Smith, who leaves the show during the fifth.  Chyler Leigh first appears in the third as the half-sister of Meredith, Lexie Grey.

Kevin McKidd playing Dr. Owen Hunt was signed as a series regular after originally being cast for a specific story arc joins the cast in season 5. Jessica Capshaw is given series regular status at the beginning of the sixth season after playing peds-attending Arizona Robbins in season 5. Following O'Malley's death and Stevens' departure, Jesse Williams and Sarah Drew joined the cast as new residents from Mercy West Jackson Avery and April Kepner both having made their series debuts as recurring characters in the sixth season. Kim Raver, who was cast as recurring character Dr. Teddy Altman in the sixth season, was given star billing later in the season.

In the tenth season, the new batch of interns introduced during the ninth season were made series regulars including Camilla Luddington as Dr. Jo Wilson, Gaius Charles as Dr. Shane Ross, Jerrika Hinton as Dr. Stephanie Edwards, Tessa Ferrer as Dr. Leah Murphy with the exception of Tina Majorino as Dr. Heather Brooks (who died during the second episode of the tenth season. Caterina Scorsone was upgraded to a series regular to continue her role as Dr. Amelia Shepherd, one of Dr. Derek Shepherd's four sisters. Scorsone previously played Dr. Amelia Shepherd since the seventh season as a recurring role. Kelly McCreary as Dr. Maggie Pierce was promoted to a series regular after being credited as guest-starring until the eleventh episode of eleventh season. The cast has received numerous awards and nominations, including a Screen Actors Guild Award for Outstanding Performance by an Ensemble in a Drama Series, a Golden Globe Award for Best Television Series – Drama, and numerous Primetime Emmy Award nominations for individual cast members.

Cast

Main
;Legend
  = Main cast (credited)
  = Recurring cast (3+)
  = Guest cast (1–2)

Recurring

Notes

References

External links

 List of Grey's Anatomy cast members at the Internet Movie Database

A
Grey's Anatomy